Radio Metro is a community Australian radio station located on Gold Coast, Queensland.

It is the only youth community radio station on the Gold Coast. The majority of Radio Metro's demographic is between the ages of 15-35, specifically 18-24.

History

1995-2001: Hott FM
Radio Metro was originally broadcast as Hott FM in July 1995 from a shed in Nerang, Queensland on weekends with a weak mono signal. At the end of 1997, the Australian Broadcasting Authority (ABA- now the ACMA- Australian Communications and Media Authority) granted Radio Metro a full-time community broadcast permit.

2001-2013: Radio Metro
Hott FM changed its name to Radio Metro in 2001. The station is available locally, nationally and internationally through the station website and play national and international Dance, R'n'b, Top 40 & Leftfield tracks.

Programming
Programs on the station include the following:

 A State of Trance with Armin van Buuren
 Group Therapy with Above & Beyond
 SINPHONY Radio with Timmy Trumpet
 Tiësto's Club Life with Tiësto
 Darklight Sessions with Fedde Le Grand
 Jacked Radio wih Afrojack
 Radio Wonderland Allison Wonderland
 Team Tiger with Tigerlily
 The Spot with Solardo
 The Birdhouse with Claude VonStroke
 Safari Radio with Mobin Master and friends
 Aoki's House with Steve Aoki
 Heldeep Radio with Oliver Heldens
 Fonk Radio with Dannic
 The Martin Garrix Show
 GUD Vibrations with Nightmare and Slander
 Nervo Nation with Nervo
 Vicious Sound System with Vicious Recordings

References

External links
http://www.radiometro.com.au/ Radio Metro

Australian radio networks
Dance radio stations
Radio stations established in 1995
Radio stations on the Gold Coast, Queensland